Quapaw, or Arkansas, is a Siouan language of the Quapaw people, originally from a region in present-day Arkansas. It is now spoken in Oklahoma.

It is similar to the other Dhegihan languages: Kansa, Omaha, Osage and Ponca.

Written documentation
The Quapaw language is well-documented in field notes and publications from many individuals including by George Izard in 1827, by Lewis F. Hadly in 1882, from 19th-century linguist James Owen Dorsey, in 1940 by Frank Thomas Siebert, and, in the 1970s by linguist Robert Rankin.

The Quapaw language does not conform well to English language phonetics, and a writing system for the language has not been formally adopted. All of the existing source material on the language utilizes different writing systems, making reading and understanding the language difficult for the novice learner. To address this issue, an online dictionary of the Quapaw language is being compiled which incorporates all of the existing source material known to exist into one document using a version of the International Phonetic Alphabet which has been adapted for Siouan languages.

Phonology

Consonants

Vowels

Revitalization
Ardina Moore taught Quapaw language classes through the tribe. As of 2012, Quapaw language lessons are available online or by DVD.

An online audio lexicon of the Quapaw language is available on the tribal website to assist language learners. The lexicon incorporates audio of first language speakers who were born between 1870 and 1918.

The 2nd Annual Dhegiha Gathering in 2012 brought Quapaw, Osage, Kaw, Ponca, and Omaha speakers together to share best practices in language revitalization. A Quapaw Tribal Youth Language and Cultural Preservation Camp teaches the language to children, and the Quapaw Tribal Museum offers classes for adults.

Notes

External links 

 Quapaw lexicon, Quapaw Tribe of Oklahoma
 Quapaw Dictionary, Quapaw Tribe of Oklahoma
 Historical works on the Quapaw Language, Quapaw Tribe of Oklahoma
 George Izard Quapaw Dictionary from 1827, Quapaw Tribe of Oklahoma
 Frank Siebert Quapaw Dictionary from 1940, Quapaw Tribe of Oklahoma
 Robert Rankin Quapaw Dictionary from 1974
Quapaw Indian Language (Alkansea, Arkansas, Ogahpah, Kwapa)
Quapaw Language Reference (Google doc)
OLAC resources in and about the Quapaw language

language
Native American language revitalization
Indigenous languages of Oklahoma
Western Siouan languages